Mecyclothorax giffardi is a species of ground beetle in the subfamily Psydrinae. It was described by Liebherr in 2005.

References

giffardi
Beetles described in 2005